Supernova is the sixth studio album by Japanese rock band Alice Nine. It was released on March 19, 2014 in two editions: the regular edition containing only the CD and the limited edition containing the CD and a DVD. Supernova peaked at the 39th position on the Oricon Albums Chart.

Track listing

Personnel 
 Shou (将) – vocal
 Hiroto (ヒロト) – guitar
 Tora (虎) – guitar
 Saga (沙我) – bass
 Nao (ナオ) – drums

References 

Japanese-language albums
2014 albums
Alice Nine albums